Zhù Huá (祝华), is Professor of Language Learning and Intercultural Communication at the UCL Institute of Education, University College London, and Chair of the British Association for Applied Linguistics. She was previously Chair of Educational Linguistics in the School of Education at the University of Birmingham, and Professor of Applied Linguistics and Communication at Birkbeck College, University of London. She was a member of the Education subpanel of the 2021 UK Research Excellence Framework (REF), member of the 2020 Hong Kong Research Assessment Exercise, and chairs the grant assessment panel for language and linguistics for the Hong Kong Research Grants Council. She is Fellow of the Academy of Social Sciences, UK, and the International Academy for Intercultural Research https://www.intercultural-academy.net/.

She was born in China and studied telecommunication and English at Beijing Post and Telecommunication University  (北京邮电大学). She has an MA in Applied Linguistics from Beijing Normal University and was the first doctoral student of the late Professor Qian Yuan  (钱瑗), the daughter of the well known Chinese scholars and writers Qian Zhongshu  (钱锺书) and Yang Jiang  (杨绛). She later obtained her PhD in Speech Sciences from Newcastle University in Britain.

Her research spans over cross-linguistic studies of child language acquisition, speech and language disorders of young children, pragmatics, multilingualism, and intercultural communication. She is author of Phonological Development in Specific Context (2002), and editor of Phonological Development and Disorder (with Barbara Dodd, 2006), Language Teaching/Learning as Social Inter-Action (with Paul Seedhouse, Li Wei and Vivian Cook, 2007), and The Language and Intercultural Communication Reader (2011). She is also one of the authors of the clinical assessment DEAP: Diagnostic Evaluation of Articulation and Phonology. She has served as Reviews Editor of The International Journal of Bilingualism (Sage) and is the Forum and Reviews Editor of Applied Linguistics (OUP). She worked as Sir James Knott Post-Doctoral Research Fellow, Lecturer and Senior Lecturer at Newcastle University, Reader at Birkbeck, and has held visiting and honorary professorships in a number of Australian and Chinese universities. She is the first Chinese-born woman linguist to be made a full professor in a British university. She was elected Fellow of the Academy of Social Sciences, UK, in 2019.

References

External links 

Living people
Academics of the University of London
Alumni of Newcastle University
Beijing Normal University alumni
Chinese expatriates in the United Kingdom
Manchu people
Year of birth missing (living people)